are a pair of interconnected freshwater lakes in the alluvial plain of the Hasama River, a tributary of the Kitakami River in Miyagi Prefecture, Japan. In 1967 the birdlife and habitat of the lakes were designated a Natural Monument. In 1985 an area of 559 hectares was designated a Ramsar Site. In 1996 the sound of the Izunuma-Uchinuma greater white-fronted goose was selected as one of the 100 Soundscapes of Japan by the Ministry of the Environment.

See also
 Ramsar Sites in Japan
 100 Soundscapes of Japan
 List of Special Places of Scenic Beauty, Special Historic Sites and Special Natural Monuments

References

External links
 Izunuma-Uchinuma

Ramsar sites in Japan
Landforms of Miyagi Prefecture
Protected areas of Japan
Lakes of Japan